Solo discography of the Blur guitarist and member Graham Coxon.

Albums

Studio albums

Live albums
 Live at the Zodiac (2004) Download only EP
 Burnt to Bitz: At the Astoria (2006) Limited edition CD and download

DVD
Live at the Zodiac (2005)

Singles

As featured artist

Compilation appearances
 Great Xpectations (1993) - "For Tomorrow" (live with Damon Albarn)
 The Pink Floyd & Syd Barrett Story (2003) - "Love You"
 The Xfm Sessions (2007) - "Dawn Said" (live with Wild Billy Childish & The Buff Medways)

Guest appearances
 Sleeper - Smart (1995) (saxophone on "Vegas")
 Assembly Line People - Subdivision of Being (1998) (producer)
 Idlewild - "Rusty" (Poor Soldier remix) (2000)
 Mower - Mower (2002) (producer)
 Beastie Boys - "Triple Trouble" (Graham Coxon remix) (2004)
 Lowgold - "Beauty Dies Young" (Graham Coxon remix) (2005)
 Sham 69 - "Hurry Up England - The People's Anthem" (2006)
 Ed Harcourt - The Beautiful Lie (2006) (guitar on "Visit from the Dead Dog")
 Crisis featuring Beth Ditto, Paul Weller, The Enemy, Supergrass - "Consequences" (2008)
 John McCusker - Under One Sky (2008) (vocals on "All Has Gone")
 Paul Weller - 22 Dreams (2008) (drums on "Black River")
 Pete Doherty - Grace/Wastelands (2009) (guitar on several songs)
 Gorillaz - Humanz (2017) (guitar on "Submission")
 Gorillaz - The Now Now (2018) (guitar on "Magic City")

See also
 Blur discography
 Damon Albarn discography

References

External links
 
 
 

Discographies of British artists
Rock music discographies
Discography